The 1965–66 season was Blackpool F.C.'s 58th season (57th consecutive) in the Football League. They competed in the 22-team Division One, then the top tier of English football, finishing thirteenth.

Ray Charnley was the club's top overall scorer for the eighth consecutive season, with 19 goals. Alan Ball (sixteen goals) shared the accolade with him in the league.

Table

Notes

References

Blackpool F.C.
Blackpool F.C. seasons